The 2025 IHF Men's Youth World Championship will be 11th edition of the championship to be held at Slovenia under the aegis of International Handball Federation (IHF). It will be first time in history that the championship will be organised by Handball Federation of Slovenia.

Bidding process
Three nations entered bid for hosting the tournament:
 
 
 

North Macedonia and Poland later withdrew their bid. The tournament was awarded to Slovenia by IHF Council in its meeting held in Cairo, Egypt on 28 February 2020.

References

External links

2025 Youth
Men's Youth World Handball Championship
International handball competitions hosted by Slovenia
2025 in Slovenian sport
Men's Youth World Handball
World Men's Youth